Stephen Augustus Lusher (born 18 October 1945) is a former Australian politician. He was a member of the National Country Party (NCP) and served in the House of Representatives from 1974 to 1984.

Lusher was born in Sydney, the son of Supreme Court of New South Wales judge Edwin Lusher. He rose to become Assistant Federal Director of the Country Party National Secretariat. In 1974, he was elected to the Australian House of Representatives, defeating Labor member Frank Olley for the seat of Hume. He was re-elected in 1975, 1977, 1980 and 1983. During the 1983–84 Parliament he was Shadow minister for Transport. In January 1984, following the retirement of Doug Anthony, Lusher unsuccessfully stood for the leadership of the NCP against Ian Sinclair. He then stood unsuccessfully for the deputy leadership. At the December 1984 election, following a major federal redistribution, the Liberal member for Farrer, Wal Fife, contested Hume and Lusher was defeated.

References

National Party of Australia members of the Parliament of Australia
Members of the Australian House of Representatives for Hume
Members of the Australian House of Representatives
1945 births
Living people
People educated at Saint Ignatius' College, Riverview
20th-century Australian politicians